Mosson may refer to :
 Mosson, Côte-d'Or, a commune of Côte-d'Or département, France

La Mosson may refer to :
 La Mosson (neighbourhood), one of the seven neighbourhoods of Montpellier, France
 La Mosson (river), a tributary of the Lez river in Hérault département, France
 Château de la Mosson or Château de Bonnier de la Mosson, one of the Montpellier follies built in 1723 by Jean Giral
 Stade de la Mosson, a stadium in Montpellier, France